HMCS Lanark was a  that served with the Royal Canadian Navy during the Second World War and again from 1956–1965 as a . She fought primarily in the Battle of the Atlantic as a convoy escort. She was named for Lanark, Ontario.

Lanark was ordered in June 1942 as part of the 1942–1943 River-class building program. She was laid down on 25 September 1943 by Canadian Vickers Ltd. at Montreal, Quebec and launched 10 December 1943. She was commissioned into the RCN on 6 July 1944 at Montreal.

Background

The River-class frigate was designed by William Reed of Smith's Dock Company of South Bank-on-Tees. Originally called a "twin-screw corvette", its purpose was to improve on the convoy escort classes in service with the Royal Navy at the time, including the Flower-class corvette. The first orders were placed by the Royal Navy in 1940 and the vessels were named for rivers in the United Kingdom, giving name to the class. In Canada they were named after towns and cities though they kept the same designation. The name "frigate" was suggested by Vice-Admiral Percy Nelles of the Royal Canadian Navy and was adopted later that year.

Improvements over the corvette design included improved accommodation which was markedly better. For underwater targets, the River-class frigate was equipped with a Hedgehog anti-submarine mortar and depth charge rails aft and four side-mounted throwers.

River-class frigates were the first Royal Canadian Navy warships to carry the 147B Sword horizontal fan echo sonar transmitter in addition to the irregular ASDIC. This allowed the ship to maintain contact with targets even while firing unless a target was struck. Improved radar and direction-finding equipment improved the RCN's ability to find and track enemy submarines over the previous classes.

Canada originally ordered the construction of 33 frigates in October 1941. The design was too big for the shipyards on the Great Lakes so all the frigates built in Canada were built in dockyards along the west coast or along the St. Lawrence River. In all Canada ordered the construction of 60 frigates including ten for the Royal Navy that transferred two to the United States Navy.

Service history
After working up in Bermuda, Lanark was assigned to the newly formed Mid-Ocean Escort Force escort group C-7 in October 1944. Captained by John Stairs of Montreal. Until June 1945, she served as a trans-Atlantic convoy escort with the group, usually as the Senior Officer's Ship. In June 1945, she returned to Canada, beginning a tropicalization refit in mid-July in preparation for service in the South Pacific Ocean. The refit was cancelled on 31 August 1945 due to the Surrender of Japan and Lanark was paid off at Sydney, Nova Scotia on 24 October.

Postwar service
Lanark was sold to Marine Industries Ltd. in 1946. In 1954, Lanark was repurchased by the Royal Canadian Navy and sent for conversion to a Prestonian-class frigate. This meant a flush-decked appearance aft, with a larger bridge and taller funnel. Her hull forward was strengthened against ice and the quarterdeck was enclosed to contain two Squid anti-submarine mortars. The conversion was begun in 1954 and completed in 1955. Lanark was re-commissioned into the RCN on 15 April 1956 with the new pennant number 321.

Lanark served mainly on the eastern coast with the Seventh Canadian Escort Squadron as a training ship. Lanark took the ship in tow in heavy seas after the ocean-going tugboat Riverton was forced to head for shelter due to the heavy seas. Lanark brought the ship to Sydney, where Riverton took over the tow into the harbour. In May 1960, the frigate began a tour of the Great Lakes and Saint Lawrence Seaway, making several port visits. In March 1961, Lanark was among the ships that took part in a combined naval exercise with the United States Navy off Nova Scotia. She served until 19 March 1965 when she was paid off for the last time. She was sold in 1965 and taken to La Spezia, Italy to be broken up in 1966.

References

Notes

Sources
 
 Macpherson, Ken; Burgess, John. The ships of Canada's naval forces 1910–1981 : a complete pictorial history of Canadian warships. Collins: Toronto, 1981.

External links
 History of the RCSCC Lanark 211

River-class frigates of the Royal Canadian Navy
1943 ships